The Electoral Registration and Administration Act 2013 (c. 6) is an Act of the Parliament of the United Kingdom which amended electoral law in the United Kingdom. It introduced Individual Electoral Registration (IER).

The Westminster government had introduced IER to Northern Ireland in 2002 in the Electoral Fraud (Northern Ireland) Act 2002, but England, Wales and Scotland continued to use a system of householder registration.

With the Sixth Periodic Review of Westminster constituencies in some doubt following the collapse of the House of Lords Reform Bill 2012, there had been some criticism of the money spent on boundary reviews whilst also favouring introducing IER. The Electoral Commission suggested that there could be a severe drop in turnout as a result. Section 6 of the Act effectively postponed the Sixth Periodic Review until "not before 1 October 2018".

There are three parts to the Act.

Part 1: Individual Electoral Registration in Great Britain

This part has twelve sections, which introduce and set the administrative structure for IER. The Act amends the Representation of the People Act 1983 and the Representation of the People Act 2000.

Alterations and improvements to the annual canvass of voters are introduced in this part.

Part 2: Administration and Conduct of Elections etc

This part alters the timetable of parliamentary elections, modifies the timetable for civil parish elections in England and Wales, changes the regulations around the register of electors in specific circumstances, and alters the 1983 Representation of the People Act with regard to polling districts.

Section 18 introduces changes to existing regulations relating to the "inadequate performance" of returning officers.

Section 19 modifies the rules on joint ticket candidatures at elections, permitting the use of an emblem of one of the parties or a combined emblem on ballot papers.

Section 22 repeals from the provisions of the Electoral Administration Act 2006 for the setting up of a Coordinated Online Register of Electors.

Part 3: Final Provisions
This section deals with the extent and name of the Act.

Proposed amendments

Committee stage discussion of the Bill commenced on Monday 29 November. Amongst proposed amendments put forward for debate was a clause allowing for weekend voting, put forward by Lord Rennard and Lord Tyler.

References

External links
 http://www.legislation.gov.uk/ukpga/2013/6/contents

Election law in the United Kingdom
Election legislation
Electoral reform in the United Kingdom
United Kingdom Acts of Parliament 2013